In seismology, a supershear earthquake is an earthquake in which the propagation of the rupture along the fault surface occurs at speeds in excess of the seismic shear wave (S-wave) velocity. This causes an effect analogous to a sonic boom.

Rupture propagation velocity
During seismic events along a fault surface the displacement initiates at the focus and then propagates outwards. Typically for large earthquakes the focus lies towards one end of the slip surface and much of the propagation is unidirectional (e.g. the 2008 Sichuan and 2004 Indian Ocean earthquakes). Theoretical studies have in the past suggested that the upper bound for propagation velocity is that of Rayleigh waves, approximately 0.92 of the shear wave velocity. However, evidence of propagation at velocities between S-wave and compressional wave (P-wave) values have been reported for several earthquakes in agreement with theoretical and laboratory studies that support the possibility of rupture propagation in this velocity range.

Occurrence

Evidence of rupture propagation at velocities greater than S-wave velocities expected for the surrounding crust have been observed for several large earthquakes associated with strike-slip faults. During strike-slip, the main component of rupture propagation will be horizontal, in the direction of displacement, as a Mode II (in-plane) shear crack. This contrasts with a dip-slip rupture where the main direction of rupture propagation will be perpendicular to the displacement, like a Mode III (anti-plane) shear crack. Theoretical studies have shown that Mode III cracks are limited to the shear wave velocity but that Mode II cracks can propagate between the S and P-wave velocities and this may explain why supershear earthquakes have not been observed on dip-slip faults.

Initiation of supershear rupture
The rupture velocity range between those of Rayleigh waves and shear waves remains forbidden for a Mode II crack (a good approximation to a strike-slip rupture). This means that a rupture cannot accelerate from Rayleigh speed to shear wave speed. In the "Burridge–Andrews" mechanism, supershear rupture is initiated on a 'daughter' rupture in the zone of high shear stress developed at the propagating tip of the initial rupture. Because of this high stress zone, this daughter rupture is able start propagating at supershear speed before combining with the existing rupture. Experimental shear crack rupture, using plates of a photoelastic material, has produced a transition from sub-Rayleigh to supershear rupture by a mechanism that "qualitatively conforms to the well-known
Burridge-Andrews mechanism".

Geological effects
The high rates of strain expected near faults that are affected by supershear propagation are thought to generate what is described as pulverized rocks. The pulverization involves the development of many small microcracks at a scale smaller than the grain size of the rock, while preserving the earlier fabric, quite distinct from the normal brecciation and cataclasis found in most fault zones. Such rocks have been reported up to 400 m away from large strike-slip faults, such as the San Andreas Fault. The link between supershear and the occurrence of pulverized rocks is supported by laboratory experiments that show very high strain rates are necessary to cause such intense fracturing.

Examples

Directly observed
 1999 Izmit earthquake, magnitude Mw 7.6 associated with strike-slip movement on the North Anatolian Fault Zone
 1999 Düzce earthquake, magnitude Mw 7.2 associated with strike-slip movement on the North Anatolian Fault Zone
 2001 Kunlun earthquake, magnitude Mw 7.8 associated with strike-slip movement on the Kunlun fault
 2002 Denali earthquake, magnitude Mw 7.9 associated with strike-slip movement on the Denali Fault
 2008 Sichuan earthquake, magnitude Mw 7.9 associated with strike-slip movement on the Longmenshan Fault
 2010 Yushu earthquake, magnitude Mw 6.9 associated with strike-slip movement on the Yushu Fault
 2012 Indian Ocean earthquakes, magnitude Mw 8.6 associated with strike-slip on several fault segments - the first supershear event recognised in oceanic lithosphere.
 2013 Craig, Alaska earthquake, magnitude Mw 7.6 associated with strike-slip on the Queen Charlotte Fault - the first supershear event recognised on an oceanic plate boundary.
 2014 Aegean Sea earthquake, magnitude Mw 6.9, supershear was recognised during the second sub-event.
 2015 Tajikistan earthquake, magnitude Mw 7.2, supershear slip on two segments, with normal slip at the restraining bend linking them.
 2016 Romanche fracture zone earthquake, magnitude 7.1, westwards-directed supershear rupture following an initial easterly-travelling phase on the Romanche ocean transform fault in the equatorial Atlantic
 2017 Komandorsky Islands earthquake, magnitude Mw 7.7, supershear transition followed a rupture jump across a fault stepover.
 2018 Swan Islands earthquake,  7.5 earthquake consisted of three sub-events with a compact rupture area and large cosesimic slip. 
 2018 Sulawesi earthquake, magnitude Mw 7.5, associated with strike-slip movement on the Palu-Koro Fault
 2020 Caribbean Sea earthquake, magnitude Mw 7.7, unilateral rupture propagation westward from the epicenter along a 300 km section of the Oriente transform fault with two episodes of supershear rupture
 2021 Maduo earthquake,  7.4 earthquake in the Tibetan Plateau. This earthquake ruptured bilaterally for a length of 170 km within the Bayan Har block.

Inferred
 1906 San Francisco earthquake, magnitude  7.8 associated with strike-slip movement on the San Andreas Fault
 1979 Imperial Valley earthquake, magnitude  6.4 associated with slip on the Imperial Fault
 1990 Sakhalin earthquake,  7.2 earthquake at over 600 km depth inferred to have ruptured at supershear speeds.
 2013 Okhotsk Sea earthquake magnitude  6.7 aftershock was an extremely deep (640 kilometers (400 miles)) supershear as well as unusually fast at "eight kilometers per second (five miles per second), nearly 50 percent faster than the shear wave velocity at that depth."

See also
Slow earthquake

References

Further reading

External links
Eric Dunham's webpage on Supershear Dynamics

 
Seismology
Types of earthquake
Strike-slip earthquakes